Tiverton Rugby Club is a rugby union club based in the town of Tiverton, Devon, England. The club plays at Coronation Field, and as of the 2014–15 season competes in the level seven Tribute Western Counties West league and the Devon Intermediate Cup. It is considered to be the oldest rugby club in Devon.

History
Tiverton Rugby Club was the opposing team in the first recorded rugger match played by the boys of Blundell's School in 1868. According to the club's website, the game was played under the school's own rules: with twenty players in each team, no flags, a referee and two umpires and it was known as the "carrying game".

The team adopted the standard rugby rules in 1870, following which it played not only against the school but against teams from nearby towns such as Crediton, Exeter and Wellington. During the 1880s the club was considered to be one of the top clubs in the South West, and won the inaugural Devon Rugby Football Union annual competition in 1888.

Since then, the club's website reports, the sport has at one time almost been forgotten in the town while at other times there have been as many as four town clubs competing against each other. In the 1980s the club was three times champions of the pre-league Devon Merit Table and four times winners of the Devon Colts Cup. In 1998 the club won the Devon Cup again after 110 years, following victory over Torquay Athletic on their own ground.

Honours
Devon Senior Cup
Winners (3): 1887, 1888, 1998
Devon Senior Vase
Winners: 2010
Devon Colts Cup
Winners (3): 1971, 1972, 1981
Havill Plate
Winners: 1980
Tribute Cornwall/Devon League
Champions: 2005–06
Runners-up: 2013–14
Devon Merit Table 1
Champions (4): 1993–94, 1998–99, 1999–00, 2004–05
Devon Merit Table 2
Champions: 2010–11

Notable former players
 Arthur Fagan (England)
 Charles Burt (England Schools)
 Craig Gillies (England A, Worcester Warriors, Llanelli Scarlets, Richmond, Bath)
 Matt Kvesic (England, England U20, England U18, England U16, Gloucester, Stourbridge, Worcester Warriors)
 Willie Luangrath (Laos)

See also
 Oldest football clubs
 History of rugby union
 English rugby union system

References

External links
 Official club website

English rugby union teams
Rugby clubs established in 1868
1868 establishments in England
Rugby union in Devon
Tiverton, Devon